Dr Williams's Library is a small English research library in Gordon Square, Bloomsbury, London.  Historically, it has had a strong Unitarian focus. The library has also been known as  University Hall.

History
The library was founded using the estate of Daniel Williams (1643–1716) as a theological library, intended for the use of ministers of religion, students and others studying theology, religion and ecclesiastical history. Several of its first directors were ministers associated with Newington Green Unitarian Church. The library opened in 1729 at Red Cross Street with its original benefaction of around 7600 books from Williams.  Its site moved frequently, until the acquisition of its present home, University Hall in Gordon Square, in 1890. It has always had close ties with the Unitarians, and after a V-1 flying bomb destroyed Essex Hall, the headquarters of the General Assembly of Unitarian and Free Christian Churches, the Library offered a few spare rooms to displaced workers. They stayed for 14 years, until 1958.

Holdings
In addition to its theological holdings, the library contains collections of philosophy, history, literature, and related subjects. There is also a large collection of works on Byzantine history and culture bequeathed by Norman H. Baynes (1877–1961). In 1976, it acquired the library of New College London, which until then had trained Congregationalist ministers.

The library is known to researchers of history and genealogy for its holdings of pre-19th century material relating to Protestant nonconformity in England, including papers by Dissenting minister Joshua Toulmin. It holds the manuscript of a 17th-century diary written by Roger Morrice (1628–1702), an English Puritan minister and political journalist; it covers the years 1677 to 1691, and in 2007 the Boydell Press published a six volume edition of Roger Morrice's Entring Book. The library also has many manuscripts of Philip Doddridge (1702–1751), a Nonconformist leader, educator, and hymnwriter, including letters between Doddridge and his wife, his wife's diary and some of his artifacts.

On 13 July 2006 the library offered for sale at Sotheby's its copy of Shakespeare's First Folio. The book sold for a hammer price of £2.8 million. The library's director, David Wykes, commented:

Amongst its aims was that, for a small fee, it kept a central registry of births mainly (but not solely) within non-conformist families, to avoid the necessity of having to have a child baptised in the Anglican church. It had variable success; up to 49,000 births were registered there until after a few months of the General Register Office for England and Wales starting up in 1837, following the Births and Deaths Registration Act the previous year. These registers are now at The National Archives under class RG5 and indexed in RG4.

See also 
 Gladstone's Library, Hawarden, formerly known as St Deiniol's Library
 The Evangelical Library, London
 Dr Williams School, Dolgellau, named after the same benefactor (closed 1975, now Coleg Meirion-Dwyfor)

References

External links
 
 Dr Williams's Centre for Dissenting Studies
 Dr Williams's Library at Google Cultural Institute

1729 establishments in England
Libraries in the London Borough of Camden